Princes Bridge may refer to:

 Princes Bridge, over the Barwon River in Victoria, Australia
 Princes Bridge, over the Yarra River in Melbourne, Australia
 Princes Bridge railway station in Melbourne